Gustavo Nascimento da Costa (born 20 March 1995), known as Gustavo, is a Brazilian professional footballer who played as a midfielder for Olympiakos Nicosia. His brother is the ex Bulgarian national and Ludogorets Razgrad player, Marcelinho.

Career
Gustavo made his professional debut in the Campeonato Brasileiro Série B for Mogi Mirim on 9 May 2015 in a game against Criciúma.

References

External links

Living people
1995 births
Sportspeople from Amazonas (Brazilian state)
Brazilian footballers
Association football midfielders
Campeonato Brasileiro Série B players
Campeonato Brasileiro Série C players
Liga Portugal 2 players
Mogi Mirim Esporte Clube players
Portimonense S.C. players
F.C. Penafiel players
G.D. Estoril Praia players
C.D. Cova da Piedade players
Olympiakos Nicosia players
Brazilian expatriate footballers
Brazilian expatriate sportspeople in Portugal
Expatriate footballers in Portugal